Giovanni Scanzi (23 February 1840 – 15 April 1915) was an Italian sculptor. His early apprenticeship led to formal studies in Rome, followed by a career as a prolific artist and teacher. He was particularly active creating monuments for the Monumental Cemetery of Staglieno in Genoa, with many other works located in museums, churches and public venues in Genoa and elsewhere.

Biography 
Giovanni Scanzi was born in Genoa in 1840. At the age of 12, he entered the workshop of sculptor Santo Varni, where he began dusting statues and gradually developed his skills. Varni was a professor at the Accademia Ligustica, and encouraged his protégé at the beginning of his studies. In 1863 Scanzi won the Durazzo Prize, which gave him the opportunity to go to Rome to continue his
studies. There he met Giulio Monteverde, also the winner of the Rome prize. From 1879 to 1892, Scanzi was a professor at the Accademia Ligustica. ,  and Francesco Messina were among his students.

The Monumental Cemetery of Staglieno contains about 50 monuments created by Scanzi, including the tombs of Carlo di G.B. Casella (1877),  Giacomo Carpaneto (1886), Elisa Falcone (Cippo No.1024, 1893) and Giacomo Pastorino (1896).

Giovanni Scanzi died in Genoa on 15 April 1915.

Major works

Genoa

Accademia Ligustica 
 Busto di ragazza - Terracotta
 Giacomo Borgonovo - Busto, gesso
 Madonna delle Vigne - 2 bronzi. Studi per l'esemplare definitivo in argento inviato a Benedetto XV
 Busto di donna - Terracotta

Albergo dei poveri 
 G. Polleri

Biblioteca Berio 
 Ritratto di bambina
 L'orfana

Galleria dell'Arte Moderna, Musei di Nervi 
 Come son contenta - 1884

Giardini dell'Acquasola 
 Busto di Martin Piaggio - Viale 3 novembre

Ospedale di Pammattone 
 B. Centurione

Villetta di Negro 
 G.C. Abba

Già Circolo Filologico 
 G. Leopardi

Palazzo Tursi 
 Giuseppina Tollot

Stazione marittima 
 Colonna Commemorativa della Spedizione dei Mille - Inaugurato il 5 maggio 1910, Ponte dei Mille

Chiesa dell'Immacolata 
 S. Giuseppe - Secondo altare destro
 Abramo - Secondo altare destro
 David - Secondo altare destro
 S. Giorgio - Facciata (replica nella tomba di famiglia)
 Vergine - Cupola

Chiesa di San Giacomo di Carignano 
 Statua del Sacro Cuore - Facciata, Bronzo dorato, 1912

Cimitero di Staglieno 
 Giovanni Battista Barbieri - 1875 (Porticato Superiore ponente, cippo 172)
 Nicola Bertollo (Bertollo-Ferralasco) - 1915 (Prima Galleria Frontale, Nicchione IV)
 Giacomo Borgonovo - 1897 (Porticato Inferiore Levante, Nicchione XXXIX)
 Domenico Bozzano - 1875
 Angela Maria Capurro, Giuseppina Grillo - 1876
 Ada Carena - 1880 (Boschetto irregolare, Cippo 454)
 Giacomo Carpaneto - 1886 (Porticato Inferiore Levante, Nicchione CII)
 Carlo di G.B. Casella - 1877 (Porticato inferiore)
 Colomba Cassanello, vedova Bottaro - 1876 (Porticato Superiore Ponente, Cippo nº 208)
 Edoardo Cipollina - 1907
 Giuseppe Costa
 Giuseppina Palau Costa - 1878
 Luigi Croce - 1891
 Adelaide Dapino
 Della Torre - 1905
 Cesare Dellepiane
 Gerolamo Durazzo
 Elisa Falcone - 1893 (Porticato Inferiore Levante. Cippo nº 1024)
 Luigi Faveto - 1888 (Porticato Superiore Levante, Cippo nº 440)
 Giuseppe Ferraro - 1869
 Emanuele Ferrea - 1905
 Famiglia Ghilino - 1890 (Porticato Inferiore Levante, Nicchione CI)
 Giovanni Giazotto - 1898 (Porticato Inferiore Levante, Cippo nº 1367)
 G.B. Granara - 1882 (Porticato Superiore Levante. Cippo)
 Giuseppina Grillo - 1874 (Porticato Superiore Levante, N.XXI)
 Michele Lavagnino - 1905
 Michele Marré - 1884
 Grillo Vittoria Marré - 1870
 G.B. Montano - 1873
 Stanislao Morasso - 1906 (1902? Galleria semicircolare)
 Luigi Oviglio - 1903
 Luigi Parodi - 1914
 Giacomo Pastorino - 1896
 Agostino e Maria Pavese - 1866 (1885? Porticato superiore levante)
 Carlo Peri - 1900, Boschetto irregolare
 Ester Piaggio - 1885 (Porticato Superiore Levante, Nicchione XX)
 Tommaso Piccardo - 1904
 Bo Pasquale Podestà - 1875
 Alvigini Emilia Romanengo - 1900
 Scanzi - 1897 (Porticato Inferiore, Nicchione LXXXIV)
 Giuseppe Sebastiano - 1908
 G.B. Semino - 1878
 Antonio Villa - 1905
 Gianbattista Villa - 1903
 Wuy Calderoni (Porticato Inferiore Levante, Cippo nº 289)

Savona

Zinola 
 Viglienzoni Angelo - 1911

Perugia 
 Cesaroni

Gallery

Note

References

Bibliography 
 Panzetta, Arturo. Nuovo dizionario degli scultori italiani dell'Ottocento e del primo Novecento: da Antonio Canova ad Arturo Martini, Volume 1. Torino: AdArte, 2003
 Partecipazio. Staglieno - Guida del Visitatore, Terza Edizione. Genova: Tipografia del R. Istituto Sordo-Muti, 1883 (eBook: books.google.com/ )
 La Vita italiana: rivista illustrata, Vol. 5, 1895, p.166

External links 
 

1840 births
1915 deaths
Italian male sculptors